Bobby Hamilton (born July 1, 1971) is a former American football defensive end. He was originally signed by the Seattle Seahawks as an undrafted free agent in 1994. He played college football at Southern Mississippi.

Early years
Hamilton attended East Marion High School in Columbia, Mississippi and was a student and a letterman in football, basketball, baseball, and track. Bobby Hamilton graduated from East Marion High School in 1989.

College career
Hamilton attended the University of Southern Mississippi and was a student and a football standout. In football, he was a four-year letterman and a two-year starter, and finished his impressive college football career with 18 sacks and 173 tackles (18 for losses).

External links
Cleveland Browns bio
New England Patriots bio
New York Jets bio

1971 births
Living people
People from Columbia, Mississippi
American football defensive ends
Southern Miss Golden Eagles football players
Seattle Seahawks players
Amsterdam Admirals players
New York Jets players
New England Patriots players
Oakland Raiders players
Cleveland Browns players